Neda Naldi (30 January 1913 – 26 June 1993) was an Italian theatrical actress—also known under her stage name Talia Volpiana—and television and film actress. She was born as Italia Volpiana on 30 January 1913 in Tramutola, Basilicata, Italy. She was an actress and writer, known for La leggenda azzurra (1940), Lacrime di sangue (1944) and Vietato ai minorenni (1944). She was married to Salvo Randone. She died on 26 June 1993 in Rome, Lazio, Italy.

Selected filmography
 Guest for One Night (1939)
 The Sons of the Marquis Lucera (1939)

References

External links

1910s births
1993 deaths
Italian stage actresses
Italian television actresses
Italian film actresses
20th-century Italian actresses